Mangok Mathiang (born 8 October 1992) is a South Sudanese-Australian professional basketball player for Hapoel Eilat of the Israeli Basketball Premier League. He played college basketball for the University of Louisville.

Early life and high school career
Mathiang was born in Juba in what is now South Sudan, in central Africa. At the age of five, he, his mother, and five siblings fled war-torn Sudan and moved to Egypt (which Mathiang described as "not that much better than Sudan"), to set up a move to Australia. His father, Alfret, decided to stay behind in Sudan. 

Mathiang and the rest of his family arrived in Sydney, Australia, with extended family members when he was seven years old, before moving to Melbourne, Australia, a year later, where he then lived for several years. Until he was 16 years old, Mathiang played Australian rules football, rugby, track, and soccer for Emmanuel College in the Melbourne suburb of Altona North. However, due to him being 1.98m tall, he was encouraged to start playing basketball instead. He moved to the United States  with his friend, Ran Tut, to achieve that goal.

During his junior year of high school in 2010-11, he played basketball for Brehm Preparatory School in Carbondale, Illinois. After that, Mathiang moved to Bradenton, Florida to play his senior season in 2011-12 at the IMG Academy. In his senior season, he averaged 14 points, 10 rebounds, and 4 blocks per game as he helped the IMG Academy get a 28-2 record. While Mathiang also received offers from Kansas State University, University of Georgia, Mississippi State University, Auburn University, and Central Michigan University, he ultimately chose to go to the University of Louisville for the people there.

College career
He originally was with the Louisville Cardinals during the 2012-13 season, but due to NCAA regulations relating to international players like Mathaing, he was forced to sit out his first season with the team. Despite that, he still traveled and trained with the team throughout the season, all the way into the 2013 NCAA Championship Game, where the Cardinals won their third NCAA Tournament. Throughout his NCAA career, Mathiang mostly played as a bench reserve over 114 career games, usually alternating spots as a starter at times for Louisville. In his freshman season, he was seventh in the AAC in blocked shots per game (1.4). In his sophomore season, he was sixth in the ACC in blocked shots per game (1.4). 

During his junior season, when he was team captain for the second straight season, he was limited to playing in only 10 games total due to his breaking the fifth metatarsal  in his left foot which sidelined him for the majority of that season, and he averaged 7.1 points and 5.7 rebounds in 18.8 minutes of action per game. As a result of when the injury came about, he was not deemed eligible for another redshirt season that year. His best season was his senior year with Louisville, when he averaged 7.8 points and 6.0 rebounds in 20.8 minutes of action per game in 33 games played. He was on the ACC All-Academic Team in 2015 and 2016.

Professional career

Charlotte Hornets and Greensboro Swarm (2017–2018)
After going undrafted in the 2017 NBA draft, Mathiang played for the Charlotte Hornets during the 2017 NBA Summer League. In the five games played for the Hornets during the Orlando Summer League, he averaged 4.4 points and 5.0 rebounds in 17.2 minutes per game for the team off the bench. On 2 August 2017, Mathiang signed a two-way contract with the Hornets. Under the terms of the deal, he split the 2017–18 season with the Hornets and their NBA G League affiliate, the Greensboro Swarm. He played just 20 minutes at the NBA level, becoming the fifth Sudanese-born player to appear in a NBA game, joining Manute Bol, Deng Gai, Luol Deng, and Thon Maker. He spent most of his time in the G League. There, with the Swarm, he averaged 10.8 points, 9.2 rebounds, and 1.4 blocks in 25.3 minutes per game. He was waived by the Hornets on 15 August 2018.

Guerino Vanoli Basket (2018–2019)
On 22 August 2018, Mathiang signed with Vanoli Cremona of the Lega Basket Serie A. He averaged 11.3 points and 10.2 rebounds per game, and was named Eurobasket All-Italian Serie A Honorable Mention. Cremona went to win its first Italian Cup ever by beating New Basket Brindisi 83–74 in the Finals.

Bahçeşehir Koleji (2019–2020)
On 11 July 2019, Mathiang signed with Bahçeşehir Koleji of the Turkish Basketbol Süper Ligi (BSL). He averaged 12.7 points and 10.6 rebounds per game.

Cedevita Olimpija (2020–2021)
Mathiang was set to play for Cedevita Olimpija of the ABA League in the 2020–21 season, but later missed the whole season after sustaining a right leg injury in practice that required surgery. He re-signed with Cedevita Olimpija in May 2021, but was let go in August 2021 after the injury worsened.

Illawarra Hawks (2022–2023)
After a four-game stint with the Casey Cavaliers during the 2022 NBL1 South season, Mathiang signed with the Illawarra Hawks of the National Basketball League on 29 July 2022. He parted ways with the Hawks on 26 January 2023 to take up a playing opportunity overseas. He averaged 7.7 points, 5.1 rebounds, and 1.0 blocks (6th in the league) in 25 games during the 2022–23 NBL season.

Hapoel Eilat (2023–present)
On 29 January 2023, Mathiang signed with Hapoel Eilat of the Israeli Basketball Premier League.

National team career
Mathiang made his debut for the Australian national team in a 2019 FIBA World Cup qualifying match against Kazakhstan.

Career statistics

NBA

Regular season

|-
| style="text-align:left;"| 
| style="text-align;left;"| Charlotte
| 4 || 0 || 5.0 || .571 || – || .000 || 2.5 || .0 || .3 || .0 || 2.0
|- class="sortbottom"
| style="text-align:center;" colspan="2"| Career
| 4 || 0 || 5.0 || .571 || – || .000 || 2.5 || .0 || .3 || .0 || 2.0

College

|-
| style="text-align:left;"| 2013–14
| style="text-align:left;"| Louisville
| 37 || 14 || 14.7 || .528 || – || .619 || 3.6 || .4 || .4 || 1.4 || 3.6
|-
| style="text-align:left;"| 2014–15
| style="text-align:left;"| Louisville
| 34 || 9 || 18.7 || .388 || – || .481 || 4.7 || .5 || .6 || 1.4 || 2.6
|-
| style="text-align:left;"| 2015–16
| style="text-align:left;"| Louisville
| 10 || 2 || 18.8 || .563 || – || .586 || 5.7 || .5 || .7 || 1.2 || 7.1
|-
| style="text-align:left;"| 2016–17
| style="text-align:left;"| Louisville
| 33 || 19 || 20.8 || .531 || – || .671 || 6.0 || .7 || .5 || 1.1 || 7.8
|- class="sortbottom"
| style="text-align:center;" colspan="2"| Career
| 114 || 44 || 18.0 || .506 || – || .599 || 4.8 || .5 || .5 || 1.3 || 4.8

References

External links
Louisville Cardinals bio

1992 births
Living people
Australian expatriate basketball people in Israel
Australian expatriate basketball people in Italy
Australian expatriate basketball people in Slovenia
Australian expatriate basketball people in the United States
Australian expatriate basketball people in Turkey
Australian men's basketball players
Bahçeşehir Koleji S.K. players
Basketball players from Melbourne
Basketball players from Sydney
Centers (basketball)
Charlotte Hornets players
Greensboro Swarm players
Hapoel Eilat basketball players
Illawarra Hawks players
Lega Basket Serie A players
Louisville Cardinals men's basketball players
National Basketball Association players from Australia
People from Juba
Power forwards (basketball)
Refugees in Egypt
South Sudanese emigrants to Australia
South Sudanese expatriate basketball people in Israel
South Sudanese expatriate basketball people in Italy
South Sudanese expatriate basketball people in Slovenia
South Sudanese expatriate basketball people in the United States
South Sudanese expatriate basketball people in Turkey
South Sudanese men's basketball players
South Sudanese refugees
Sportsmen from Victoria (Australia)
Undrafted National Basketball Association players
Vanoli Cremona players